Content development is the process of researching, writing, gathering, organizing, and editing information for publication.

Content development is the process of originating (creating), editing, manipulating and maintaining the contents in order to provide knowledgeable fillings to the users. Contents developed aid a lot in establishing and growing the thinking and gaining overall information about the person, company, organization, nation and almost all the fields.

Content development can be distinct from topic selection (a high-level idea such as "productivity", "social media" and so on), topic development (the main points to express in a piece of content about a given topic), and presenting the content (public speaking, writing etc.)

Content development may also refer to:
 Authoring, originating content for any medium
 Content designer, designing content for any medium 
 Editing content for any medium
 Content development (web), developing content for the World Wide Web
 Technical content development (traditionally called Technical Writing), developing product-related content to help end-users, support, partners and clients to understand and master products

See also
 Content management
 Content management systems
 Component content management systems
 Content development at Wikiversity - creating learning resources